Tre brødre som ikke er brødre (meaning Three brothers who aren't brothers) is a Norwegian comedy television show which ran for six episodes during the autumn of 2005 on the Norwegian public broadcaster NRK. It featured noted comedians Harald Eia, Bård Tufte Johansen, and Atle Antonsen.

External links
 Official site

Television sketch shows
Norwegian comedy television series
NRK original programming